In Gaelic Ireland, between the 5th and 9th centuries AD, a dairthech (literally "oak-house") was a type of oratory or church built of oak-wood.

Histories

The dairthech was the earliest kind of church built in Ireland, from the earliest Christian times (5th century AD) onward. They were gradually replaced by stone churches.

Structure

It had a high pointed gable. Oak was used as a building material as a holdover from Celtic religion, where the oak was imbued with magical powers.

Internal structure

Little is known about the internal structure of the dairthech, although descriptions of the murder of Echtigern in Kildare in AD 760 offer a few hints, mentioning a chancel-screen (Old Irish: cróchaingel) and altar (altóir). Cogitosus describes painted partitions dividing clergy from laity and women from men.

References

Church architecture
Types of church buildings